Cell Systems is a monthly peer-reviewed scientific journal covering research in systems biology. The journal was established in 2015 and published by Cell Press. According to the Journal Citation Reports, the journal has a 2021 impact factor of 11.091.

References

External links
 

Biology journals
English-language journals
Cell Press academic journals
Publications established in 2015
Bimonthly journals